The First Battle of Rivas occurred on June 29, 1855, as part of the struggle to resist William Walker, an American filibuster, adventurer and mercenary who arrived in Nicaragua with a small army of mercenaries in June 1855 in support of the Liberal democratic government of General Francisco Castellón in the Nicaraguan civil war. His army, with local support, was able to defeat the Legitimist party (Aristocratic) and conclude the Nicaraguan civil war.

Background
A civil war was then raging in the Central American republic of Nicaragua. The Liberal party (Democratic) and the Legitimist party (Aristocratic), were constantly warring with one another as they tried to gain political control through violent means. "During a period of six years Nicaragua had had no fewer than fifteen presidents." When Walker first arrived with The Falange (Filibuster mercenary/adventurer army), he proposed this venture as a show of strength.

The battle
"Colonel" Walker had under his command a force of about 45 filibusters armed entirely with rifles and revolvers, and a native contingent of about 100 men. The two groups were arrayed in a column marching formation with the filibusters in front, ammo and supply pack-horses in the middle, and the natives bringing up the rear. About a half of a mile from the town, he met with his senior officers and notified them of his plan. Walker's two "captains" were to advance into the city and drive the Legitimists from the streets, while the natives were to follow closely behind to provide protection for their rear and flanks.
   
The Americans advanced into the city at about 12 pm, absorbing most of their casualties in this first clash. They halted some of the way into the city, to reload and for some respite, expecting further action. But the natives, still some distance from the fighting were interdicted by a large body of Legitimists troops, and believing Walker's contingent to be destroyed the Democratic leader retreated from Rivas. Walker and his men, still held up in a small patch of houses, all the while reaping a heavy toll upon the Legitimist forces with their rifles noticed that they were alone.

Legitimist forces attempted to bring up a small cannon to shell the filibusters out of the homes, but it was disabled in a sally by the mercenaries. 
The Legitimists then attempted to burn the filibusters out of the homes, succeeding in setting one alight. At this point, after four hours of combat, the order to retreat was called by Walker. The first men out of the houses surprised the Nicaraguans closest to them, and the remainder of the Legitimist forces were momentarily stunned by the American advance. As a result of the confusion, the filibusters were able to withdraw with only one more fatality.

Aftermath  
Walker withdrew to friendlier territory, and his forces were augmented by hundreds of filibusters and natives. According to various sources, Walker and his men inflicted such heavy casualties upon the nationals, that they were forced to withdraw from the city in the aftermath of the battle. Although by all measures, (including his own) his forces were defeated, Walker conquered the city.

References

Rivas
Rivas 1856
1855 in Nicaragua
June 1855 events